Dostuk is a village in Naryn District of Naryn Region of Kyrgyzstan on the river Naryn and highway A361 about 35 km west of Naryn. Its population was 750 in 2021. Until 2012 it was an urban-type settlement.

Population

References

External links
Dostuk Map – Maplandia.com

 

Populated places in Naryn Region